Stanisław Cikowski (14 February 1899 – 2 December 1959) was a Polish footballer. He competed in the men's tournament at the 1924 Summer Olympics.

References

External links

1899 births
1959 deaths
Polish footballers
Poland international footballers
Olympic footballers of Poland
Footballers at the 1924 Summer Olympics
People from Nowy Targ County
Sportspeople from Lesser Poland Voivodeship
Polish Austro-Hungarians
People from the Kingdom of Galicia and Lodomeria
MKS Cracovia (football) players
Association football midfielders